was a village located in Kamimashiki District, Kumamoto Prefecture, Japan.

As of 2003, the village had an estimated population of 3,122 people and a population density of 24.11 people per km². The total area was 129.49 km².

On February 11, 2005, Seiwa, along with the town of Yabe (also from Kamimashiki District), and the town of Soyō (from Aso District), merged to create the town of Yamato and no longer exist as independent municipality.

External links
 Official website of Yamato 

Dissolved municipalities of Kumamoto Prefecture